"Lady Navigation" is the eighth single by B'z, released on March 27, 1991. This song is one of B'z many number-one singles in Oricon chart. The single was re-released in 2003, and re-entered at #6. This song sold over 1,172,000 copies, becoming their first single to sell over one million copies, according to Oricon. It also charted at #7 in the 1991 yearly charts, becoming their first yearly top 10. The song won "the best five single award" at the 6th Japan Gold Disc Award.

Track listing 
Lady Navigation

Certifications

References

External links
B'z official website

1991 singles
B'z songs
Oricon Weekly number-one singles
Songs written by Tak Matsumoto
Songs written by Koshi Inaba
1991 songs
BMG Japan singles